Argentina have competed in all the Rugby World Cup tournaments, starting with the inaugural 1987 tournament.

Their best result was finishing in third place in the 2007 tournament, played in France. They defeated the host side France in their opening game, then beat the other teams in Pool D, finishing top of the pool. In the knockout stage, they defeated Scotland in the quarter finals, before losing in the semi finals to eventual champions South Africa. In the Bronze Final they once again faced France, whom they defeated for a second time to attain third place.

Their second best result was fourth place in 2015. They also progressed past the pool stage in 1999 and 2011. In 1999 they defeated Ireland in the quarter final play-offs, but lost in the quarter-finals to France. In 2011 they lost to host team New Zealand in the quarter-finals.

Argentina has yet to host the World Cup. The Argentina national team is the most successful of any national side from the Americas at the tournament.

By position

By matches

1987

1991

Pool 3 games -

1995

Pool B games -

1999

Pool D games

Quarter final place offs -

Quarter finals -

2003

Group A games -

2007

Los Pumas began their final preparation for the 2007 World Cup with a two-test series against visiting Ireland, who was grouped against them in France. In the first test on 26 May at Santa Fe, they scored a 22–20 win on a last-minute drop goal by Felipe Contepomi. Both teams were heavily experimental, especially the Irish, with stars such as Brian O'Driscoll, Ronan O'Gara, Paul O'Connell and Gordon D'Arcy missing from the touring squad. The Pumas were themselves missing many stars who were playing that weekend in the final round of the 2006–07 Top 14 season in France. The second test against Ireland was a 16-0 Pumas win at Vélez Sársfield on 2 June. They split their final warmup tests, defeating neighbours  70–14 at CASI in Buenos Aires on 4 August and losing to Wales at Millennium Stadium 27–20 on 18 August.

At the World Cup, Los Pumas were drawn into the so-called pool of death, featuring two other teams ranked in the top six in the IRB rankings—Ireland and the hosts France. On top of this, they opened the World Cup at Stade de France against the French, marking the third consecutive World Cup in which they played against the host nation in the World Cup opener. In possibly one of their finest hours, the Pumas took a 17–9 lead into the half, and held on for a surprising 17–12 win.  The Pumas subsequently beat Georgia 33–3 on 11 September at the Stade de Gerland, Lyon. Argentina then went on to beat Namibia 63–3 in Marseille, the biggest winning margin in Argentine World Cup history. They then went on to secure a 30–15 victory against Ireland which ensured that they topped the group. They then defeated Scotland 19–13 in the quarter-final at the Stade de France. The Pumas' improbable run towards the Webb Ellis trophy ended in a comprehensive 37–13 defeat by the Springboks in the semi-final at Stade de France. However, the Pumas recovered to beat France for the second time in the 2007 Rugby World Cup, a 34–10 win in the 3rd/4th place playoff.  The 3rd place showing for the Pumas in the 2007 World Cup was Argentina's best ever result in Rugby World Cup history, equal or better to the best showing by IRB founding nations Wales (who were 3rd in the 1987 Rugby World Cup), Scotland (who were 4th in the 1991 Rugby World Cup) and Ireland (which has never qualified for the Rugby World Cup semi-finals).

During their World Cup run, the normally football-crazed Argentines embraced the Pumas so much that El Superclásico, the Buenos Aires football derby between Boca Juniors and River Plate that is normally the biggest event in Argentine sport, was rescheduled so that it would not conflict with the Pumas' quarter-final match. As the only major Spanish language country in the 2007 Rugby World Cup, the Pumas also had considerable support from rugby fans in Spain, Uruguay, and other Latin American countries during their impressive five-game winning streak.

Pool D games -

Quarter-finals -

Semi-finals -

Bronze final game -

2011

Quarter-finals

2015

Quarter-finals

Semi-finals

Bronze final game -

2019

Overall record

Hosting
So far Argentina has not hosted any World Cup games, as no RWC has been held in the Americas yet.

References

World
Rugby World Cup by nation